Olrat was an Oceanic language of Gaua island, in northern Vanuatu. It became extinct in 2009, with the death of its last speaker Maten Womal.

Name
The name Olrat (spelled natively as Ōlrat ) is an endonym. Robert Codrington mentions a place south of Lakon village under the Mota name Ulrata. A few decades later, Sidney Ray mentions the language briefly in 1926 under the same Mota name ‒ but provides no linguistic information.

The language

In 2003, only three speakers of Olrat remained, who lived on the middle-west coast of Gaua. Their community had left their inland hamlet of Olrat in the first half of the 20th century, and merged into the larger village of Jōlap where Lakon is dominant.

Alexandre François identifies Olrat as a distinct language from its immediate neighbor Lakon, on phonological, grammatical, and lexical grounds.

Phonology
Olrat has 14 phonemic vowels. These include 7 short /i ɪ ɛ a ɔ ʊ u/ and 7 long vowels /iː ɪː ɛː aː ɔː ʊː uː/.

Historically, the phonologization of vowel length originates in the compensatory lengthening of short vowels when the voiced velar fricative  was lost syllable-finally.

Grammar
The system of personal pronouns in Olrat contrasts clusivity, and distinguishes four numbers (singular, dual, trial, plural).

Spatial reference in Olrat is based on a system of geocentric (absolute) directionals, which is typical of Oceanic languages.

Notes and references

References

Bibliography

 .

External links
 Linguistic map of north Vanuatu, showing range of Olrat on Gaua.
 A book of traditional stories, monolingual in Olrat language (site of linguist A. François)
 Access to audio recordings in Olrat language (section of the Pangloss Collection, CNRS)
 Petition to create ISO code for Olrat

Banks–Torres languages
Critically endangered languages
Endangered languages of Oceania
Languages of Vanuatu
Torba Province